{{DISPLAYTITLE:C16H24N2O2}}

The molecular formula C16H24N2O2 (molar mass : 276.37 g/mol) may refer to :
 5,6-MeO-MiPT, a lesser-known psychedelic drug
 Molindone, a therapeutic antipsychotic